Dejan Nemec (born 1 March 1977) is a Slovenian former professional footballer who played as a goalkeeper.

Club career
Nemec played for Mura between 1995 and 2000 and in Belgium for Club Brugge between 2000 and 2003.

International career
Nemec played for the Slovenia national football team (1 cap against Honduras in 2002) and was the third goalkeeper (behind Marko Simeunovič and Mladen Dabanovič) at the Euro 2000 and 2002 FIFA World Cup team squad.

Honours
Club Brugge
Belgian Cup: 2001–02

References

External links
 
 NZS profile 

1977 births
Living people
Prekmurje Slovenes
People from Murska Sobota
Slovenian footballers
Association football goalkeepers
Slovenia under-21 international footballers
Slovenia international footballers
Slovenian expatriate footballers
Slovenian PrvaLiga players
Belgian Pro League players
Club Brugge KV players
UEFA Euro 2000 players
2002 FIFA World Cup players
NK Mura players
NK Domžale players
Expatriate footballers in Belgium
Slovenian expatriate sportspeople in Belgium
Slovenia youth international footballers